Remedy is the fifth studio album by folk, country and old-time music band, Old Crow Medicine Show. The album, produced by Ted Hutt, was released on July 1, 2014. It won the 2015 Grammy Award for Best Folk Album. The album is the band's first to feature Chance McCoy and their last with Gill Landry. Remedy also marks the return of founder member Critter Fuqua to the band's line-up.

Track listing

Personnel
Ketch Secor - Vocals, harmonica, mandolin, fiddle, piano, banjo, percussion
Critter Fuqua - Banjo, vocals, spoons, accordion, banjo, guitar, percussion
Chance McCoy - Guitar, vocals, hambone, mandolin, dulcimer, percussion, fiddle
Gill Landry - Dobro, vocals, banjo, pedal steel, steel guitar, lead vocal on track 13
Cory Younts - Drums, vocals, mandolin, percussion, Jew's harp, harmonica
Kevin Hayes - Guitjo, vocals, percussion, lead vocal on track 12
Morgan Jahnig - Bass, vocals, chimes, percussion
Bucky Baxter - Pedal steel on track 6
Ted Hutt - Percussion on track 13

Chart performance

References

2014 albums
Albums produced by Ted Hutt
ATO Records albums
Old Crow Medicine Show albums